Arthrocladiella is a genus of fungi in the family Erysiphaceae.

References

External links
Index Fungorum

Leotiomycetes
Fungal plant pathogens and diseases